HMS Athenienne was a brig, probably a French privateer that the French Navy requisitioned circa April 1796, but that the British captured off Barbados and commissioned later that year before selling her in 1802.

On 3 May 1796  captured the French corvette Athénienne off Barbados at  after a 14-hour long chase. Athénienne was armed with 14 guns and had a crew of 83 men under the command of lieutenant de vaisseau Gervais. She had thrown 10 of her guns overboard during the chase. The Royal Navy took her into service as HMS Athénienne.

Citations and references
Citations

References
 
 
 
 

1790s ships
Captured ships
Brigs of the French Navy
Brigs of the Royal Navy